Government College of Engineering, Erode (formerly Institute of Road and Transport Technology (IRTT)) is a state government run Engineering institution located near Chithode in the city of Erode, Tamil Nadu, India. It is a Government institution listed under category 1 colleges by the Directorate of Technical Education, Tamil Nadu. Originally, the college was established under Institute of Road and Transport by the Tamil Nadu State Transport Corporation. It is located off Salem-Kochi National Highway 544 at a distance of 10 km from Erode Central Bus Terminus and 12 km from Erode Junction railway station.

College website: www.gcee.ac.in

History
The Institute of Road and Transport Technology  was established in 1984 by M. G. Ramachandran,  the then Chief Minister of Tamil Nadu as an automobile research-oriented engineering college. It is affiliated to Anna University and is located on a serene  campus.

On 26 August 2021, Higher Education Minister of Tamil Nadu Dr. Ponmudi announced on Tamil Nadu Legislative Assembly that The Institute of Road and Transport Technology was taken up by the government to directly run under the governance of Directorate of Technical Education (DoTE) and subsequently renamed as Government Engineering College, Erode.

The institution is functioning as the Zonal Headquarters for Zone-XI (Erode Zone) of Anna University monitoring the Engineering colleges affiliated to Anna University in Erode district and part of Namakkal, Tiruppur and Salem districts.

Academics
The institute offers following four-year undergraduate engineering courses. 35% of seats are reserved for children of TNSTC employees and remaining 65% seats are filled in TNEA counseling.

The institute also offers the following post-graduate courses

References

External links
 Official website

Engineering colleges in Tamil Nadu
Transport in Tamil Nadu
Colleges affiliated to Anna University
Universities and colleges in Erode district
Educational institutions established in 1984
1984 establishments in Tamil Nadu